The House of Guriis Eristavi or Eristavi of Guria, was a Georgian noble family, a branch of the Shervashidze, dynasts in Abkhazia. Their surname derives from the title of eristavi ("duke") the family held under the suzerainty of the reigning princes of Guria in southwest Georgia. In the 18th century the family bore the name Eristavi-Sharvashidze (ერისთავი-შერვაშიძე). In 1850, the family was received among the princely nobility of the Russian Empire as knyaz Eristov-Guriisky.

The noble family of Maksimenishvili (მაქსიმენიშვილი) was a possible collateral branch of the Eristavi-Sharvashidze. They were also confirmed in the Russian title of knyaz in 1850.

References 

Noble families of Georgia (country)
Georgian-language surnames
House of Shervashidze